High Maintenance is the debut extended play (EP) by American rapper Saweetie. It was released digitally on March 16, 2018, by Warner Records and Artistry Worldwide. It is composed of nine tracks, with "Icy Grl" having been released as a single on October 2, 2017. The EP debuted at number 32 on the Billboard R&B/Hip-Hop Album Sales chart.

Background 
After graduating, Saweetie decided to pursue a rap career. She began posting short raps on her Instagram account in 2016. One video featured her rapping over the beat from Khia's classic "My Neck, My Back (Lick It)", which would eventually turn into "Icy Grl". She first released the song on her SoundCloud in the summer of 2017 and later released a music video for it in October of the same year. The visual would go viral online. To follow that up, Saweetie released in that same month a freestyle rap called "High Maintenance" accompanied by a short clip of herself rapping a verse to the song, all while in her kitchen. It would go viral on Instagram and Twitter as well. In February 2018, she signed to Warner Records and her manager Max Gousse's record label Artistry Worldwide, subsequently releasing the EP High Maintenance in March 2018.

Composition and concept 

The songs "B.A.N." and "23" speak about relationships, and are speculated to be about her ex-boyfriends Justin Combs, who is P. Diddy's eldest son, and Keith Powers, whom she dated for up to four years.

With "high maintenance", Saweetie reportedly doesn't mean only designer things. "The relationships I have with people are very high maintenance, meaning I nurture them," she says. "Essentially, I care for them. I also pray a lot, work out, and eat well so all aspects of my life are high maintenance... Since it's an introductory to the game, I feel like it's appropriate way to brand myself."

Track listing

Notes
 "Icy Grl" contains samples of "My Neck, My Back (Lick It)", originally performed by Khia.
 "High Maintenance" contains samples of "Shake That Monkey", originally performed by Too Short.

Personnel 
Credits adapted from AllMusic.

 Gino the Ghost – background vocals
 Jonathan Cuskey – recording
 Ryan Gladieux – recording, mixing
 Jean-Marie Horvat – recording, mixing
 Leon McQuay – mixing
 Michelle Mancini – mastering

Charts

Release history

References 

2018 debut EPs
Albums produced by Zaytoven
Warner Records EPs
Hip hop albums by American artists
EPs by American artists
Hip hop EPs
Saweetie albums